Alfred W. Bareis (1893–1976) was Mayor of Madison, Wisconsin. He held the office from 1955 to 1956.

References

Mayors of Madison, Wisconsin
1893 births
1976 deaths
20th-century American politicians